The Theodore Roosevelt Rough Rider Award is an award presented by the governor of the state of North Dakota upon prominent North Dakotans.

Recipients
Note: date in parentheses indicates date of award

Lawrence Welk, entertainer (August 28, 1961)
Dorothy Stickney, actress (November 2, 1961)
Ivan Dmitri, artist (April 13, 1962)
Roger Maris, athlete (January 4, 1964)
Eric Sevareid, journalist (April 17, 1964)
General Harold K. Johnson, military service (April 23, 1965)
Dr. Anne H. Carlsen, educator (September 9, 1966)
Edward K. Thompson, journalist (April 19, 1968)
Dr. Robert Henry Bahmer, archivist (July 28, 1970)
Louis L'Amour, author (May 26, 1972)
Bertin C. Gamble, entrepreneur, founder of Gamble-Skogmo (October 20, 1972)
Casper Oimoen, athlete (February 12, 1973)
Peggy Lee, entertainer (May 23, 1975)
Harold Schafer, entrepreneur (July 4, 1975)
Era Bell Thompson, journalist (August 14, 1976)
Dr. Leon Orris Jacobson, physician (October 1, 1976)
Elizabeth Bodine, humanitarian (July 27, 1979)
Clifford "Fido" Purpur, athlete (May 16, 1981)
Phyllis Frelich, actress (April 27, 1981)
General David C. Jones, military service (May 21, 1982)
Ronald N. Davies, judge (June 11, 1987)
Phil Jackson, athlete (July 30, 1992)
Larry Woiwode, author (October 23, 1992)
Angie Dickinson, actress (December 2, 1992)
Reverend Richard C. Halverson, minister (March 26, 1994)
Brynhild Haugland, legislator (March 20, 1995)
Admiral William A. Owens, military service (January 29, 1996)
Carl Ben Eielson, pioneer aviator (August 26, 1997)
Warren Christopher, public servant (June 20, 1998)
Bobby Vee, entertainer (June 20, 1999)
Chester "Chet" Reiten, entrepreneur (October 8, 2002)
Thomas J. Clifford, educator (November 23, 2002)
Sister Thomas Welder, educator (May 1, 2004)
Harry J. Pearce, business leader (August 11, 2004)
William C. Marcil, business leader (May 18, 2006)
Woodrow W. Keeble, World War II and Korean War veteran and Medal of Honor recipient  (July 23, 2009)
Doug Burgum, Governor of North Dakota, entrepreneur and philanthropist (November 20, 2009)
Ronald D. Offutt, Agribusiness Leader and Philanthropist	, founder of RDO Equipment Company (September 15, 2011)
Louise Erdrich, author (April 19, 2013)
Herman Stern, humanitarian, social and economic activist, businessman, visionary and director of the North Dakota Winter Show, Holocaust rescuer (March 13, 2014)
Gerald W. VandeWalle, judge (January 7, 2014)
John D. Odegard, aviation pioneer (October 15, 2015)
Clint Hill, Secret Service agent (October 5, 2018)
Monique Lamoureux and Jocelyne Lamoureux, Olympic gold medalists (July 14, 2021)
Dr. Merton B Utgaard, Director and Founder of International Music Camp , located at International Peace Garden (July 29, 2022)

Sources 

North Dakota culture
State awards and decorations of the United States
Awards established in 1961
1961 establishments in North Dakota
Governor of North Dakota